Chloroiodomethane is the halomethane with the formula is .  It is a colorless liquid of use in organic synthesis. Together with other iodomethanes, chloroiodomethane is produced by some microorganisms.

Applications
Chloroiodomethane is used in cyclopropanation (Simmon-Smith reaction), where it often replaces diiodomethane because of higher yields and selectivity. It is also used in Mannich reaction, aminomethylation, epoxidation, ring opening and addition to terminal alkenes.  It is a precursor to chloromethylenating agent Ph3P=CHCl.  It reacts with organolithium compounds to give chloromethyllithium (ClCH2Li).

Crystallography
It crystallizes orthorhombic crystal system with space group Pnma with lattice constants: a = 6.383, b = 6.706, c = 8.867 (.10−1 nm).

References

External links
 Usage in organic synthesis

Halomethanes
Organochlorides
Organoiodides